Areimeh is a Syrian village located in Tartus District, Tartus. According to the Syria Central Bureau of Statistics (CBS), Areimeh had a population of 507 in the 2004 census.

Due to the region's important strategic role, the Areimeh Castle was built there.

References

Populated places in Tartus District